Marie-Louise Jean Joséphine Linssen-Vaessen (19 March 1928 – 15 February 1993) was a freestyle swimmer from the Netherlands. She competed at the 1948 and 1952 Olympics and won one silver and two bronze medals in the 100 m and 4 × 100 m events. She won three European medals in these events in 1947–1950.

References

External links 

 

1928 births
1993 deaths
Dutch female freestyle swimmers
Swimmers at the 1948 Summer Olympics
Swimmers at the 1952 Summer Olympics
Olympic swimmers of the Netherlands
Olympic silver medalists for the Netherlands
Olympic bronze medalists for the Netherlands
Medalists at the 1948 Summer Olympics
Medalists at the 1952 Summer Olympics
Sportspeople from Maastricht
Olympic bronze medalists in swimming
European Aquatics Championships medalists in swimming
Olympic silver medalists in swimming
20th-century Dutch women